City in the World is a 1968 novel by Swedish author Per Anders Fogelström. It is the  fifth and last novel of the City novels.

Plot
The narrative follows Hennings and Lotten's descendants during the post-war period in Stockholm.

References

1968 Swedish novels
Swedish-language novels
Novels set in Stockholm
Family saga novels